is a Japanese manga by Takashima Hiromi. It was serialized by Futabasha in the seinen manga magazine Comic High! between February 2008 to November 2010, and subsequently published as five bound volumes.

Plot 

Twenty-nine-year-old Kurose Kazumi is a programmer in an eroge company and has played plenty of galges when he was younger, but he's completely uninterested in young girls. A chance encounter changes that when he meets a middle schooler who suddenly says she can't date him, but he realizes how cute she is and wants to keep her with him.

Characters 
Kurose Kazumi
Kurose meets Osawa by accident and immediately has feelings for her. It's just that she's in middle school and he's 29.
Tomoe Osawa
Osawa is an honor student who is easily embarrassed, she's 13 and has a dream of being a grade school teacher when she grows up.

Seinen manga
Futabasha manga